Yangzhou Museum is the biggest museum in Yangzhou, an ancient city in Jiangsu Province of China.

Yangzhou Museum is housed in a modern building, covering an area of 50,000 square metres. It shares its lobby with the adjacent China Block Printing Museum; together the two museums are commonly known as the Yangzhou Double Museum.

History
The museum was formerly located in the 1500-year-old Tianning Temple. The museum has had a number of different homes in its history; recently, the museum moved to a new building to accommodate its growing collections.

Exhibition halls
The museum has seven exhibition halls, including Yangzhou history exhibition hall, Ancient Chinese sculpture art museum, Paintings and calligraphy of Yangzhou eight strange men hall, Collection of dynasty paintings and calligraphy in Ming dynasty and Qing dynasty hall, China national treasure hall, Jianyang printing museum and Yangzhou jianyang printing hall. Exhibits date from the neolithic age down to late Qing dynasty. It features in the relics of Han dynasty, Tang dynasty, Ming dynasty and Qing dynasty.

Exhibitions
 Ancient Chinese Earthenware
 Ancient Chinese Jade
 Ancient Chinese Calligraphy & Painting
 Bronze Ware
 Cultural Relics
 Yangzhou Paper-cut Art
 Ming and Qing Porcelain

Gallery

References

External links 

Yangzhou Museum Website

Museums in Jiangsu
Buildings and structures in Yangzhou
Decorative arts museums in China
National first-grade museums of China